The following is a timeline of the history of the city of Yokohama, Japan.

Prior to 20th century

 1859
 July: Port of Yokohama opens.
 Noge Bridge constructed.
 1860 - Orrin Freeman's photography studio begins operating.
 1861 - Japan Herald English-language newspaper in publication.
 1862 - September 14: Namamugi Incident.
 1866 - 26 November: Fire.
 1867 - Japan Gazette English-language newspaper begins publication.
 1868
 Yoshida Bashi (bridge) built.
 Yokohama Military Hospital and Yokohama Cricket Club founded.
 First barber's pole in Japan installed.
 1869
 Tokyo-Yokohama telegraph begins operating.
  publisher in business.
 1871 - Yokohama Mainichi Shinbun (newspaper) begins publication.
 1872
 May: Sinagawa-Yokohama railway begins operating; Yokohama Station built.
 Yokohama Central Hospital established.
 1873 - Suzuki Shin'ichi I's photography studio begins operating.
 1874 -  established.
 1875 - Far East English-language newspaper begins publication.
 1876 -  founded.
 1880 - Yokohama Specie Bank and Yokohama Chamber of Commerce established.
 1882 -  established.
 1886 - Cholera outbreak.
 1889 - Yokohama incorporated as a city; municipal election held.
 1890
 Tokyo-Yokohama telephone begins operating.
 Kanagawa Shimbun (newspaper) begins publication.
 Population: 127,987.
 1894 - 20 June: Earthquake/fire.
 1897 - 9 September: Typhoon.
 1898 - Population: 193,762.

20th century

 1902 - 29 September: Typhoon.
 1906 - Golf course built.
 1909 - Population: 394,303.
 1917 -  built.
 1918 - Population: 447,423.
 1920
  and  founded.
 Population: 579,310.
 1923
 September 1: 1923 Great Kantō earthquake.
  founded.
 1924 - Yokohama International School founded.
 1926 -  constructed.
 1928
  founded.
  built.
 1930
 Yamashita Park opens.
 Population: 704,236.
 1934 - Nissan Motor Co. factory begins operating.
 1938 -  constructed.
 1940 - Population: 968,091.
 1942 - Kanagawa Shimbun (newspaper) in publication.
 1944 -  founded.
 1945
 Bombing of Yokohama during World War II.
 Population: 624,994.
 1949 - Yokohama City University and Yokohama National University active.
 1950 - Population: 951,189.
 1951
 April 24: Sakuragichō train fire.
 Nogeyama Zoological Gardens founded.
 1952 - Nagahama Hall (concert hall) built.
 1956 - Yokohama designated a government ordinance city.
 1957 - Sister city relationship established with San Diego, USA.
 1960 - Population: 1,375,710.
 1961 - Yokohama Marine Tower erected.
 1963
 November 9: Tsurumi rail accident.
 Ichio Asukata becomes mayor.
 1972
 Yokohama Municipal Subway begins operating.
 , one of the predecessors of J1 League soccer club Yokohama F. Marinos, formed.
 1975 - Population: 2,620,000.
 1978
 Yokohama Stadium opens.
  becomes mayor.
 1979 - Yokohama Municipal Children's Botanical Garden established.
 1980 - Yokohama Film Festival begins.
 1981
 Yokohama Archives of History established.
 Yokohama Jazz Festival begins.
 1986 - Shinasobaya ramen eatery in business.
 1989 - Yokohama Bay Bridge and Cosmo Clock 21 (ferris wheel) open.
 1990
 Hidenobu Takahide becomes mayor.
 Population: 3,220,331.
 1992 - Yokohama Bay Stars baseball team active.
 1993 - Yokohama Flügels football team active.
 1994
 Tsurumi Tsubasa Bridge built.
 Shin-Yokohama Raumen Museum opens.
 1998 - International Stadium Yokohama opens.
 1999 - Yokohama F. Marinos football team formed.

21st century

 2002
 Hiroshi Nakada becomes mayor.
 2002 FIFA World Cup final helds in International Stadium Yokohama.
 2009 - Fumiko Hayashi elected mayor.
 2010 - Population: 3,688,773.
 2021
 2020 Summer Olympics football final helds in International Stadium Yokohama.
 2020 Summer Olympics baseball and softball final helds in Yokohama Stadium

See also
 Yokohama history
 Timeline of Yokohama (in Japanese)

References

This article incorporates information from the Japanese Wikipedia and German Wikipedia.

Bibliography

Published in the 19th century
 
  (describes 1858-1879 from expat perspective)
 

Published in the 20th century
 
 
 
 
 
 
  (includes timeline)
 

Published in the 21st century
  (first published in 1987)

External links

 Map of Yokohama, circa 1945
 Items related to Yokohama, various dates (via Europeana).
 Items related to Yokohama, various dates (via Digital Public Library of America).

Yokohama
History of Kanagawa Prefecture
Yokohama
Years in Japan